Sergiyevsky (masculine), Sergiyevskaya (feminine), or Sergiyevskoye (neuter) may refer to:
Sergiyevsky District, a district of Samara Oblast, Russia
Sergiyevskoye Municipal Okrug, a municipal okrug of Vyborgsky District of the federal city of St. Petersburg, Russia
Sergiyevsky (rural locality) (Sergiyevskaya, Sergiyevskoye), several rural localities in Russia
Anatoly Sergievsky, major character in Chess the Musical